Dorjnyambuugiin Otgondalai (born 28 January 1988) is a Mongolian lightweight boxer. He won a gold medal at the 2014 Asian Games and a bronze medal at the 2016 Summer Olympics. He was flag bearer for Mongolia during the closing ceremony of the 2016 Summer Olympics.

References

External links
 

1988 births
Living people
Mongolian male boxers
Olympic boxers of Mongolia
Boxers at the 2016 Summer Olympics
Place of birth missing (living people)
Olympic bronze medalists for Mongolia
Olympic medalists in boxing
Medalists at the 2016 Summer Olympics
Asian Games gold medalists for Mongolia
Medalists at the 2014 Asian Games
Asian Games medalists in boxing
Universiade medalists in boxing
AIBA World Boxing Championships medalists
Boxers at the 2010 Asian Games
Boxers at the 2014 Asian Games
Universiade bronze medalists for Mongolia
Lightweight boxers
Medalists at the 2013 Summer Universiade
21st-century Mongolian people
20th-century Mongolian people